The East Roman–Sassanid War of 440 was a short conflict between the East Roman Empire and the Sasanian Empire. The reason for its short ending was that the southern Roman provinces were being invaded by the Vandals, which forced the East Romans to sue for a quick end to the war to focus on the Vandal invasion. The Sasanians were also paid some gold tribute in return for peace.

History 
The Sasanian and the Roman Empire had since their peace treaty in 387 agreed that they both were obligated to cooperate in the defense of the Caucasus against nomadic attacks. The Romans helped in the defense of the Caucasus by paying the Iranians roughly 500 lbs (226 kg) of gold at irregular intervals. While the Romans saw this payment as political subsidies, the Iranians saw it as tribute, which proved that Rome was the deputy of Iran. The Roman emperor Theodosius II's unwillingness to continue the payment made shah Yazdegerd II declare war against the Romans, which had ultimately little success for either side.

The Romans were invaded in their southern provinces by the Vandals, causing Theodosius II to ask for peace and send his commander, Anatolius, personally to Yazdegerd II's camp. In the ensuing negotiations in 440, both empires promised not to build any new fortifications in Mesopotamia and that the Sasanian Empire would get some payment in order to protect the Caucasus from incursions.

References

Sources
 
 
 
 

440
440
440s conflicts
5th century in the Byzantine Empire
5th century
440s in the Byzantine Empire
5th century in Iran